Rhinella festae is a species of toad in the family Bufonidae.
It is found in Ecuador and Peru.
Its natural habitats are subtropical or tropical moist lowland forests and subtropical or tropical moist montane forests.
It is threatened by habitat loss.

References

Rhamphophryne
Taxonomy articles created by Polbot
Amphibians described in 1904